Ram Rajya is a 1943 Hindi film, directed by Vijay Bhatt, with Prem Adib and Shobhna Samarth in the lead roles of Rama And Sita. It was the third highest grossing Indian film of 1943.

The film gained significance, as for title it used the term Ram Rajya (Rule of Rama), Mahatma Gandhi often used to define democratic-righteous rule during the Indian independence struggle, and it was the only film he, who didn't think much of the medium, ever saw.
It was the first Indian movie that premiered in the USA.

Plot
Following Bhagwan Shri Ram's 14-year exile, whereby he demolishes the evil empire of Lord Ravan, rescues his wife, Sita, and returns triumphantly home to Ayodhya to be crowned the King. Bhagwan Ram arranges for Sita to be placed on top a funeral pyre, and when she comes out unscathed with the Lord of Fire himself appearing and asking Bhagwan Ram to take Sita back as she is pure, and her presence has not only purified Ayodhya, but also Sri Lanka, as well as himself. Thus satiated, Ram and Sita return to Ayodhya, but not for long as the people, especially a washer-man (Dhobi) demands that Sita be expelled from the kingdom, as the people would like him to ask his wife to leave Ayodhya as she has spent several days and nights away from husband, and has thus maligned herself. Bhagwan Ram gives way to the demands of his people, and expels Sita, who then goes to reside with Lord Valmiki, calls herself Vandevi, and gives birth to twins - Luv and Kush. In the meantime, Valmiki has finished writing the Holy Book Ramayan, and ensures that the twins read and understand this, which they do. Then when Bhagwan Ram announces an Aswamedha Yagna (to expand Ayodhya's boundaries by letting a horse run through different kingdoms, and whosoever stops the horse, challenges Bhagwan Ram and his armies). When Vandevi hears of this, she is shocked as this Yagna can only be performed by a ruler with his wife at his side, is it that Bhagwan Ram is getting married again? Before she could find any answers to this question, she is told that her sons have stopped the horse from Ayodhya - and are ready to do battle with the powerful armies of Ayodhya.

Cast
 Prem Adib as Shri Bhagwan 
 Shobhna Samarth as Devi Maa Sita/Vandevi  
 Umakant as Laxman
 G. Badri Prasad as Rishi Valmaki
 Chandrakant as Rama
 Yashwant as Luv
 Madhusudan as Kush
 Pande as Rishi Vasistha
 V.D.Pandit as Dhobi
 Amirbai Karnataki as Dhoban
 Shantakumari as Kaushalya
 Ranjana as Chitralekha
 Leela Pawar as Vasanti Sr.
 Baby Tara as Vasanti Jr.
 Bahadur as Horse 
 Phanse	
 Sitaram		
 V. Kanse			
 Chotejan			
 Athavle
 Bholaram		
 Laxman		
 Baldev			
 Kusum		
 Baby Sheela as dancer
 Baby Kamala as Child dancer

References

External links
 
 Ram Rajya (1943) on indiancine.ma

1943 films
1940s Hindi-language films
Films based on the Ramayana
Films directed by Vijay Bhatt
Films scored by Shankar Rao Vyas
Indian black-and-white films
Indian historical films
1940s historical films